Saint-Émile is a former city in central Quebec, Canada. It was amalgamated into Quebec City on January 1, 2002. It is located within the Borough of La Haute-Saint-Charles. Population: (2008) 10,989.

Neighbourhoods in Quebec City
Former municipalities in Quebec
Populated places disestablished in 2002
Canada geography articles needing translation from French Wikipedia